Torgeir is a given name. Notable people with the name include:

Arvid Torgeir Lie (born 1938), Norwegian poet, writer of short stories and translator
Torgeir Andersen (born 1916), Norwegian politician for the Conservative Party
Torgeir Anderssen-Rysst (1888–1958), Norwegian politician for the Liberal Party
Torgeir Andreas Berge (1897–1973), Norwegian farmer and politician for the Labour Party from Sandar
Torgeir Børven, Norwegian football forward currently playing for Brann
Torgeir Bjørn (born 1964), retired Norwegian cross country skier
Torgeir Bjarmann (born 1968), former Norwegian footballer
Torgeir Brandtzæg (born 1941), Norwegian ski jumper who competed between 1962 and 1965
Torgeir Bryn (born 1964), professional basketball player from Norway
Torgeir Byrknes, Norwegian DJ and producer known by his stage name TeeBee
Torgeir Garmo (born 1941), Norwegian politician for the Liberal Party
Torgeir Micaelsen (born 1979), Norwegian politician for the Labour Party
Torgeir Schjerven (born 1954), Norwegian author and lyric poet
Torgeir Svendsen (1910–1981), Norwegian politician for the Labour Party
Torgeir Toppe, Norwegian sprint canoeist who competed in the early to mid-1990s
Torgeir Trældal (born 1965), Norwegian politician and member of parliament from representing Nordland for the Progress Party

See also
 Tarjei

Norwegian masculine given names